Dioryctria nivaliensis is a species of snout moth in the genus Dioryctria. It was described by Rebel in 1892, and is known from the Canary Islands.

The larvae feed on Pinus canariensis.

References

Moths described in 1892
nivaliensis